Harold Edgley (30 November 1891–1966) was an English footballer who played in the Football League for Aston Villa, Queens Park Rangers and Stockport County.

References

1891 births
1966 deaths
English footballers
Association football forwards
English Football League players
Aston Villa F.C. players
Stourbridge F.C. players
Queens Park Rangers F.C. players
Stockport County F.C. players
Worcester City F.C. players